Arcadia University is a private university in Glenside, Pennsylvania. The university enrolls approximately 4,000 undergraduate, master's, and doctoral students. The  campus features Grey Towers Castle, a National Historic Landmark.

History

Beaver Female Seminary 
The school was founded in Beaver, Pennsylvania, in 1853 as Beaver Female Seminary.

Beaver College 
By 1872, it had attained collegiate status, under the auspices of the Methodist Episcopal Church, and was named Beaver College. The school admitted men from 1872 to 1907, then limited enrollment to women until 1972. In 1925, Beaver College moved east to Jenkintown, Pennsylvania, and changed its religious affiliation to Presbyterian Church (USA). In 1928, the school acquired the Harrison estate in Glenside, including Grey Towers Castle, the location of the current campus. The college operated both the Jenkintown and Glenside campuses until 1962, when it consolidated all activities to the Glenside campus. Some significant changes came in 1973, when the college launched its first graduate programs and began admitting men again.

Arcadia University 
The rise of the Internet, with systems designed to filter out sexually explicit material, repeatedly blocked access to the college's website. Research conducted by the institution also found that, because of its name, the institution appealed to 30% fewer prospective students. In June 2001, trustees voted to apply for university status and to change the name. In July 2001, upon attaining university status, Beaver College officially changed its name to Arcadia University.

Today, Arcadia University operates on the main Glenside campus, at academic centers and offices around the world, and in Christiana, Delaware, where the university's Department of Medical Science opened a campus in 2006.

There was a series of leadership changes at Arcadia in the years 2011–2017. In May 2011, Carl "Tobey" Oxholm III was named president of Arcadia. Less than two years later, during the school's spring break, he was fired without explanation by the board of trustees. A petition was filed to demand answers from the board of trustees, but no official reason was ever given. From 2013 to 2017, the university was led by Nicolette DeVille Christensen. In December 2017, Ajay Nair, vice-president at Emory University, was named the university's 22nd president.

Academics

Undergraduate programs

Arcadia University was ranked among the Princeton Review's "Best in the Northeast" in its "2022 Best Colleges: Region by Region."

The university offers more than 80 fields of study in its undergraduate programs. Undergraduate majors are offered in the College of Arts & Sciences, College of Health Sciences, School of Education, and School of Global Business. There is also an option for students to propose self-designed majors and minors, which may consist of courses offered in Glenside and through study abroad.

Graduate programs
Graduate and professional studies at Arcadia University range from liberal arts to professional degree programs. Arcadia's Master's program in Forensic Science is accredited by FEPAC, and faculty are certified by the American Board of Criminalistics and the American Board of Forensic Toxicology.

International programs and Study Abroad
The university is nationally ranked by U.S. News & World Report for its quality study abroad programs. For nine consecutive years, the Open Doors report from the Institute of International Education ranked Arcadia No. 1 in the nation for the percentage of undergraduate students participating in study abroad experiences at a master's level college or university.

Student life

Athletics

Arcadia University teams compete in the NCAA Division III within the MAC Commonwealth of the Middle Atlantic Conferences.

Men's sports teams include ice hockey, track and field, baseball, basketball, cross country, golf, lacrosse, soccer, swimming, tennis, and volleyball.  Women's sports teams include ice hockey, track and field, basketball, cross country, field hockey, golf, lacrosse, soccer, softball, swimming, tennis, and volleyball.

In a newly renovated 1,500-square-foot central competition arena, Arcadia competes in League of Legends, Hearthstone, Overwatch, and Rocket League.

Student organizations
As of spring 2018, Arcadia University has more than 60 active governing, academic, sport, cultural, media, religious, and service clubs and organizations.

Notable people

Alumni
 Julianne Boyd, theater director
 William R. Evanina, the NCIX, the National Counterintelligence Executive of the United States, and director of the U.S. National Counterintelligence and Security Center
 Catherine Gunsalus Gonzalez, religious author and Professor Emerita at Columbia Theological Seminary
 Joe McKeehen, World Series of Poker Main Event Champion (2015)
 Dorothy Germain Porter, amateur golf champion
 Abbey Ryan, artist (painter)
 M. Susan Savage, Secretary of State of Oklahoma and former Mayor of Tulsa, Oklahoma
 Edith Schaeffer, religious author and co-founder of the L'Abri study center
 Oliver B. Shallenberger, electrical engineer
 Anna Deavere Smith, actress
 Marjorie Smith, New Hampshire state legislator
 Florence Wickham, contralto and composer
 Anil Beephan Jr., Member of the New York State Assembly

Faculty and administration
 Hank Brown, U.S. Senator from Colorado and interim President of Arcadia University 
 Cynthia S. Burnett (1840–1932), educator, lecturer, temperance reformer, and newspaper editor
 Kelsey Koelzer, current women's ice hockey coach

See also
 Thoresby House

Notes

References

External links

 Official website

 
1853 establishments in Pennsylvania
Educational institutions established in 1853
Former women's universities and colleges in the United States
Universities and colleges affiliated with the Presbyterian Church (USA)
Universities and colleges in Montgomery County, Pennsylvania
Private universities and colleges in Pennsylvania